Lajpur is biggest village in Choryasi Taluka of Surat District located 20 km South of Surat on Surat-Navsari road  Surat, India. Lajpor Central Prison, Surat is located here.

See also 
List of tourist attractions in Surat

Suburban area of Surat
Villages in Surat district